Praseodymium(III) oxide, praseodymium oxide or praseodymia is the chemical compound composed of praseodymium and oxygen with the formula Pr2O3. It forms light green hexagonal crystals. Praseodymium(III) oxide crystallizes in the manganese(III) oxide or bixbyite structure.

Uses
Praseodymium(III) oxide can be used as a dielectric in combination with silicon. Praseodymium-doped glass, called didymium glass, turns yellow and is used in welding goggles because it blocks infrared radiation. Praseodymium(III) oxide is also used to color glass and ceramics yellow.
For coloring ceramics, also the very dark brown mixed-valence compound praseodymium(III,IV) oxide, Pr6O11, is used.

References

Praseodymium compounds
Sesquioxides